Founded in 1958, the International Mineralogical Association (IMA) is an international group of 40 national societies. The goal is to promote the science of mineralogy and to standardize the nomenclature of the 5000 plus known mineral species. The IMA is affiliated with the International Union of Geological Sciences (IUGS).

The Association supports the activities of Commissions and Working Groups involved on certain aspects of mineralogical practice and facilitates interactions among mineralogists by sponsoring and organising meetings. In particular, the IMA holds its general meeting every four years. The last meeting was scheduled in 2022 in Lyon, France.

Presidents
The presidents of the IMA have been:
 since 2022: Hans-Peter Schertl
 Bochum University
 2020-2022: Anhuai Lu
 Peking University
2018–2020: Patrick Cordier
 Université de Lille
2016–2018: Peter C. Burns
 University of Notre Dame
2014–2016: Sergey V. Krivovichev
 Saint Petersburg State University
2012–2014: Walter V. Maresch
 Ruhr University Bochum
2010–2012: Ekkehart Tillmanns
 Institute of Mineralogy and Crystallography, University of Vienna
 Mineral: tillmannsite (IMA2001-010)
2006–2010: Takamitsu Yamanaka
 Osaka University
2002–2006: Ian Parsons
 University of Edinburgh
1998–2002: Anthony (Tony) J. Naldrett
 University of Toronto
 Mineral: naldrettite (IMA2004-007)
1994–1998: Stefano Merlino
 University of Pisa
 Mineral: merlinoite (IMA1976-046)
1990–1994: Xiande Xie
 Guangzhou Institute of Geochemistry (Chinese Academy of Sciences)
 Mineral: xieite (IMA2007-056)
1986–1990: Peter John Wyllie
 California Institute of Technology (after 1984, Caltech) and University of Chicago (1965–1983)
 Mineral: wyllieite (IMA1972-015)
1982–1986: Ivan Kostov (Nikolov) (1913–2004)
 Sofia University
 Mineral: kostovite (IMA1965-002)
1978–1982: Claude (Jean Guy) Guillemin (1923–1994)
 École des Mines de Paris (Mines ParisTech)
 Mineral: guilleminite (IMA1964-031)
1974–1978: Vladimir Stepanovich Sobolev (1908–1982)
 Novosibirsk State University
 Mineral: sobolevite (IMA1982-042)
1970–1974: Karl Hugo Strunz (1910–2006)
 Technical University of Berlin
 Mineral: strunzite (1958)
1964–1970: Cecil Edgar Tilley (1894–1973)
 University of Cambridge (England)
 Mineral: tilleyite (1933)
1960–1964: Daniel Jerome Fisher (1896–1988)
 University of Chicago
 Mineral: djerfisherite (IMA1965-028)
1958–1960: Robert Lüling Parker (1893–1973)
 Swiss Federal Institute of Technology (ETH Zurich) and University of Zurich
 Mineral: parkerite (1937)

Medal
The IMA Medal for Excellence in Mineralogical Research was created in 2006. It is awarded for scientific excellence and eminence as represented by long-term outstanding scientific publication in the field of mineralogical sciences. It is one of the pre-eminent awards in mineralogical research and represents a life-time achievement award.

Medalists
 2022 - Patricia Dove
 2021 - Robert Hazen
 2020 - Georges Calas
 2019 - Eiji Ohtani
 2018 - Gordon E. Brown, Jr.
 2017 - Emil Makovicky
 2015 - Rod C. Ewing
 2013 - Nikolay V. Sobolev
 2011 - David H. Green
 2009 - Frank C. Hawthorne
 2008 - Charles Prewitt

Working groups and commissions

The most active IMA commission is the Commission on New Minerals and Mineral Names (CNMMN). It was founded in 1959 to coordinate the assigning of new mineral names, revision of existing names and discreditation of invalid species. Traditionally, the validation procedure of new minerals is one of the chairman's tasks and the discreditation or revalidation procedure of invalid species are two of the vice-chairman's tasks. In July 2006 a merger between the CNMMN and the Commission on Classification of Minerals (CCM), initiated at the request of both commissions, resulted in the Commission on New Minerals, Nomenclature and Classification (CNMNC).

Chairmen of CNMNC
Ritsuro Miyawaki (since c. 2018)
Ulf Hålenius (2015-2018); (since c. 2015); mineral: håleniusite-(La) (IMA 2003-028)
Peter (Pete) A. Williams (2008 – 2014); mineral: petewilliamsite (IMA 2002-059)
Frédéric Hatert, vice-chairman (changes in existing nomenclature)
Marco Pasero, vice-chairman (general classification matters)
Ernst A. J. Burke (2003 – August, 2008); mineral: ernstburkeite (IMA 2010-059)
Giovanni Ferraris, vice-chairman
Joel Denison Grice (1995 – 2002); mineral: griceite (IMA 1986-043)
Joseph (Joe) Anthony Mandarino (1983 – 1994); mineral: mandarinoite (IMA 1977-049)
Ernest (Ernie) H. Nickel, vice-chairman; mineral: ernienickelite (IMA 1993-002)
Akira Kato (1975 – 1982); mineral: katoite (IMA 1982-080a)
Michael (Mike) Fleischer (1959 – 1974); mineral: fleischerite (IMA 1962 s.p.)
Max Hey, vice-chairman
François Permingeat, secretary

Member societies
Among the societies represented at the IMA are:
 Associación Mineralogica Argentina		
 Bulgarian Mineralogical Society		
 Ceska geolicka spolecnost		
 Croatian Mineralogical Association		
 Deutsche Mineralogische Gesellschaft		
 Geological Society of Australia		
 Geological Society of Greece, Committee of Economic Geology Mineralogy and Geochemistry
 Koninklijk Nederlands Geologisch Mijnbouwkundig Genootschap (Royal Geological and Mining Society of the Netherlands)	
 Magyahoni Földtani Tarsulat (Hungarian Geological Society), Asvantyan-Geokémoai Szakosztally (Mineralogical and Geochemical Section)	
 Mineralogical Association of Canada		
 Mineralogical Association of South Africa		
 Mineralogical Society of America		
 Mineralogical Society of Denmark		
 Mineralogical Society of Georgia		
 Mineralogical Society of Great Britain and Ireland		
 Mineralogical Society of India		
 Mineralogical Society of Japan		
 Mineralogical Society of Korea		
 Mineralogical Society of Romania		
 Mineralogical Society of Slovakia		
 Mineralogical Society of Uzbekistan		
 Norsk Geologisk Forening, Mineralogisk Gruppe		
 New Zealand Geochemical and Mineralogical Society		
 Österreichische Mineralogische Gesellschaft		
 Polskie Towarzystwo Mineralogiczne		
 Russian Mineralogical Society		
 Schweizerische Mineralogische und Petrographische Gesellschaft		
 Slovenian Geological Society, Mineralogical Branch	
 Sociedad Española de Mineralogía		
 Sociedade Brasileira de Geologia		
 Sociedade Geologica de Portugal, Grupo de Mineralogia	
 Società Italiana di Mineralogia e Petrologia		
 Société Française de Minéralogie et de Cristallographie		
 Suomen mineraloginen seura r.y		
 The Chinese Society of Mineralogy, Petrology and Geochemistry	
 The Mineralogical Society of Egypt		
 The Swedish Mineralogical Society		
 Ukrainian Mineralogical Association		
 Union Minéralogique de Belgique

See also
List of minerals recognized by the International Mineralogical Association
List of minerals

References

External links
IMA homepage
IMA medal
IMA - Commission on New Minerals, Nomenclature and Classification (CNMNC)
IMA - Mineralogical Society of America

Mineralogy
Geology organizations
International scientific organizations
International organizations based in Canada
Organizations established in 1958